Vibranium is a fictional metal appearing in American comic books published by Marvel Comics, noted for its extraordinary abilities to absorb, store and release large amounts of kinetic energy. Mined only in Wakanda, the metal is associated with Black Panther, who wears a suit of vibranium and Captain America, who bears a vibranium/steel alloy shield. An alternate isomer of the material known as Antarctic Vibranium or Anti-Metal has appeared in the Savage Land.

Publication history
Vibranium first appeared in Daredevil #13 (February 1966), which was written by Stan Lee and illustrated by John Romita. Here, vibranium was seen to be an unusual metallic element with decidedly strange properties. Since that point in Marvel Comics continuity, it has been established that there are a few variations of this element which can be found in isolated regions all around the world. The variation first introduced in Daredevil #13 eventually became known as Anti-Metal. This variation's unique attribute is that it can cut through any known metal. In the Marvel Universe, Anti-Metal can traditionally be found only in Antarctica. Later in Fantastic Four #53 (August 1966), by Stan Lee and Jack Kirby, a new variation of vibranium was introduced in the isolated nation of Wakanda. This variation had the unique attribute of being able to absorb sound. This is the variation which is most often identified in continuity as simply "vibranium".

Fictional history
In the Marvel Universe, vibranium was first deposited on Earth by a meteorite 10,000 years ago. In the comics, the first documented discovery of vibranium was during a human expedition to Antarctica. This particular isotope of vibranium was called "Anti-Metal" due to its property of dissolving other metals.

In the comics, a different variety of vibranium found in Wakanda absorbs sound waves and other vibrations, including kinetic energy. Absorbing sound waves, vibrations, and kinetic energy makes this metal stronger. To protect this resource, Wakandans concealed their country from the outside world. Wakandan king T'Chaka funded his country's education by occasionally selling off minuscule quantities of the metal. As a result, Wakanda is one of the world's most technologically advanced nations.
 
During the early 1940s, a small amount of Wakandan vibranium came into the possession of the scientist Myron MacLain. He tried to combine vibranium with iron to form a new tank armor, but was unable to fuse the elements. One morning, he found that the two materials had bonded on their own in an unknown manner. The ultra-resilient alloy was used to create Captain America's shield. MacLain worked for decades (without success) to duplicate the accident. However, during an experiment in the 1960s, he developed the virtually indestructible metal adamantium.
 
When T'Challa became king of Wakanda, he strove to end his country's isolation from the rest of the world. Making the existence of vibranium known to the outside world around the mid-1980s, he sold small quantities of it to foreigners who, he believed, would not use it to harmful ends. T'Challa used the profits to enrich and modernize his nation.
 
Over the years, many have tried to obtain or affect the mound of vibranium at Wakanda, but for the most part Wakanda has kept it safe, and become quite powerful in the process.

During their Secret Invasion of Earth, the Skrulls assumed the identity of S.H.I.E.L.D. agents and enslaved natives of the Savage Land to mine Anti-Metal. They also invaded Wakanda. The Wakandans successfully repelled the attack.
 
When Wakanda was politically overtaken by the xenophobic Desturi, they granted Doctor Doom access to the country's vibranium vaults. Fearing Doom would use it to amplify his mystical energies, T'Challa activated a failsafe he had developed that rendered all processed vibranium inert.

The rumors about its alien origin had later been proven true, as while most of earth's vibranium had been all but liquidated, certain planetary systems carry an ample supply of the element deep within certain extraterrestrial biospheres, as was the case with a refugee planet that the Spartax Empire tried reclaiming during Captain Marvel's space travels. In the wake of the continuity-wide spanning reboot of the Marvel multiverse chronicled in Secret Wars: Battleworld, vibranium's abundance in Wakanda and beyond has re-flourished to sizable quantities, and the mutant criminal Vanisher was absconding and selling Wakandan vibranium on the black market in New York City.

When a small sub-molecular imperfection was introduced into Captain America's shield, each impact over the years spread to neighboring molecules. It grew until the molecular bonds of the shield were completely broken down, shattering the shield. The shattering effect continued to spread to other vibranium, unconnected to the shield. This created a vibranium "cancer", a shock wave propagating throughout the world. It violently detonated any vibranium it found, from mineral deposits to components of ships or equipment. The shock wave was traveling to the "Great Vibranium Mound" in Wakanda, where the resulting explosion could destroy the world. With the unwitting aid of the villain Klaw, Captain America was able to stop the cancer and restore his shield.

Properties and known abilities
In the Marvel Comics Universe, vibranium is a rare metallic substance of extraterrestrial origin. It exists in many forms:

Wakandan variety
Wakandan Vibranium is the most common variety, and is often referred to simply as "vibranium". It is a rare substance native only to the fictional small African nation of Wakanda.

The Wakandan isotope possesses the ability to absorb all vibrations in the vicinity as well as kinetic energy directed at it. The energy absorbed is stored within the bonds between the molecules that make up the substance. As a result, kinetic energy is dissipated within the bonds instead. There are limits to the capacity of the energy that can be stored, and although the exact limitations are not yet known, there have been a few examples. One such instance was when the Roxxon Energy Corporation discovered that a small island in the South Atlantic had a foundation composed of vibranium. Due to this, Roxxon found it necessary to destroy the island with explosives. Unable to absorb the force of the explosions, the vibranium was destroyed, but it succeeded in entirely absorbing the sound made by the explosion, preventing damage to the surrounding area.

This variety of vibranium is also a powerful mutagen. Vibranium exposure led to the mutation of many Wakandan natives. Its radiation has also permeated much of Wakanda's flora and fauna, including the Heart-Shaped Herb eaten by members of the Black Panther Tribe and the flesh of the White Gorilla eaten by the members of the White Gorilla Tribe. Both give superhuman abilities to whoever eats them.

It is also believed to dramatically enhance mystical energies.

Antarctic variety
Better known as Anti-Metal, this isotope is native to the Savage Land. The variation produces vibrations of a specific wavelength that break down the molecular bonds in other metals, causing them to liquefy. It was first discovered by the famous explorer named Robert Plunder; the father of Kevin and Parnival Plunder during his initial jaunt in the primordial environment untouched by time.

His more villainous son, who went on to become The Plunderer, would seek to find his father who dubbed the Plunder Stone and all recorded knowledge of the family relic only accessible through his inherited medallion fashioned from the stone, to pillage and terrorize the world by liquidating all armaments used against him. Wakandan vibranium is able to become an artificial and unstable form of the Anti-Metal variety of vibranium through certain particle bombardments on it. If huge quantities of Anti-Metal are gathered together, the vibrations increase exponentially. One such case occurred with the most stable reactionary transformation baryon beam bombardment.

Much like natural Wakandan vibranium, Antarctic vibranium can cause human mutations. One person who donned an Anti-Metal full body suit for protection against Moon Knight and his arsenal began to emit the same metal-melting radiation he had intended to weaponize.

Artificial variety
There are at least two forms of man made vibranium created outside of Wakanda through various means. The first variant is called NuForm which featured in the Vibranium Vendetta event of Marvel Comics imprint, created by the Roxxon Corporation for unknown reasons, It was an alchemic blend made through the combination of organic and mineral elements, the properties of this Vibranium brand mimicked natural vibranium but had the tendency to degrade into Antarctic vibranium unless tempered through use of microwave bombardment, and even then that was only a temporary solution.

The second is a particularly dangerous artificial brand created at Horizon Labs by Professor Sajani Jaffrey called Reverbium.

Unlike standard vibranium, this faux material rapidly amplifies and projects sound and vibratory energy in pulse waves which would only strengthen over time before violently detonating. Max Modell, head scientist of Horizon at the time, ordered its immediate dissolution given how dangerous it was but Sajani held on to some of it without her team's knowledge. Reverbium would turn up again in the hands of A.I.M Scientists under the influence of Klaw, who had used it in a new scheme against Black Panther and the nation of Wakanda; the faux vibranium also had the effect of enhancing his sonic powers to unknown degrees.

Living variety
Famed Wakandan scientist and Wakanda University professor Obinna Nwabueze discovered a new form of vibranium. Testing its subatomic structure, he concluded that the metal had a sort of sentience.

The naturally occurring sentient metal came from the echo caves of the Dora Milaje, the king's personal guard. Each recruit who entered the caves imprinted upon the Living Vibranium; each trainee took some into their bodies. The metal would sometimes take the form of visitors. The Dora fashioned weapons to control Living Vibranium, including the Talking Drum to guide a devastating weapon called the Mimic-27.

The Dora Milaje also use the treated Living Vibranium in special spears they wield to better bond with and access the domain which stores their special vibranium's sentience.

Other properties include, but are not limited to, having a natural symbiosis with both its contents and the environment around it. Being capable of causing all manner of disruptive geological phenomena like earthquakes and sending local wildlife into a frenzy. As well as other effects like emitting carrier waves which allow it to sync with other vibranium caches to activate or depower it, show the recipient users visions of their future, as well as emit vibrations instead of absorbing them for the purpose of entering and exiting a separate dimension where the Mimic's conscious mind awaits those who seek its use. The metal itself is incredibly volatile because of this, coming with the risk of running rampant and causing all manner of havoc and devastation if improperly handled or making contact with an errant character template.

Notable uses

Vibranium appears frequently in the Marvel Universe.

 It is most known for being used in the construction of Captain America's shield, the vibranium was of an ultra-resilient vibranium-iron alloy created by Dr. Myron MacLain. The formula has never been reproduced despite numerous attempts.
 After Steve Rogers resigned as Captain America, the Black Panther sent him a new, pure vibranium shield. When Rogers resumed his role as Captain America, the vibranium shield was given to U.S. Agent.
 As U.S. Agent, John Walker has also used two other vibranium shields: the "eagle shield" he used as a member of the Jury, and the "star shield" he used as a member of the New Invaders.
 The Black Panther uses vibranium in a micro weave mesh in his uniform that robs incoming objects of their momentum. He also cannot be stabbed, although the costume and the Black Panther can be cut if the attacker slashes along the uniform's grain. Beyond that he uses vibranium in the soles of his boots that allows him to survive a fall of several stories and, if given enough momentum, the Panther can also scale walls or skim across water. The field can also be used offensively to shatter or weaken objects, such as kicking something with the boots. He also used the other variety Anti-Metal, in retractable claws.
 By 1915, human expeditions discovered Anti-Metal in Antarctica.
 The story "Flags of Our Fathers", which happens during World War II, tells how Black Panther, Captain America, Sgt. Fury and his Howling Commandos fight the Nazis who want to steal vibranium from the Wakandans.
 Skrulls enslaved Savage Land natives to mine Anti-Metal.
 Dr. Myron MacLain created "true" adamantium in an attempt to reproduce the vibranium alloy he had made for Captain America's shield.
 Parnival Plunder, the villainous brother of Ka-Zar, planned to use vibranium to make weapons with which to take over the world.
 Diablo became the ruler of Tierra del Maiz, a South American country known for its large deposits of vibranium. While the United Nations had decided not to get involved in the internal affairs of the country, Canada thought differently and sent Alpha Flight to intervene.
 When Dr. Doom gained access to Wakanda's stores of vibranium, T'Challa activated a fail-safe that rendered all processed vibranium inert.
 Both Vibranium compounds were processed by Jack O Lantern and Crime Master, then given to Nrosvekistanian weapons manufacturer in Eastern Europe for arsenalization purposes. 
 Captain Marvel discovered Vibranium is in fact alien in origin during a Spartax lethally poisoning Mining & smuggling Op.
 Vibranium in Wakanda and worldwide has been restored after events of Battleworld.

In other media

Television
 Vibranium appears in the Spider-Man and His Amazing Friends episode "The X-Men Adventure". The villain Cyberiad captures the X-Men in their own Danger Room with traps designed to utilize their greatest weaknesses. In particular, he trapped Kitty Pryde in a room made of Vibranium to counteract her ability to "phase" through solid matter.
 Vibranium appears in Iron Man: Armored Adventures. This version of the element is depicted as a dark grey metal that emits green electricity. In the episode "Panther's Prey", Iron Man and Black Panther work to stop Moses Magnum from selling a piece of stolen Vibranium to A.I.M., which the latter would later use to bring MODOK to life in the episode "Designed Only for Chaos". In the episodes "Line of Fire" and "Titanium vs. Iron", Justin Hammer and Mr. Fix acquire Vibranium to fuse it with titanium and create a unique alloy for the former's Titanium Man armor.
 Vibranium appears in The Avengers: Earth's Mightiest Heroes. This version is depicted as a purple metal that vibrates when sound is applied to it as well as glow brighter the more sound is applied until it reaches its limit and explodes. It also has mutagenic properties, as it turned Klaw into a being of pure sound energy, and is mined from a large cave in a mountain near the Wakandan capital.
 Vibranium plays a central role in the Marvel Animation and BET Entertainment produced animated series Black Panther.
 In the live-action Marvel Cinematic Universe (MCU) series Agents of S.H.I.E.L.D. episodes "Love in the Time of Hydra", "One Door Closes", and "Afterlife", Bruce Banner built a cabin called the "Retreat" for S.H.I.E.L.D.'s use out of vibranium to temporarily house gifted individuals.

Film
 Vibranium appears in the Marvel Animated Features series of films.
 In Ultimate Avengers: The Movie, the Chitauri use Vibranium in their spacecraft hulls and personal armor. S.H.I.E.L.D. later salvages one of their ships and use it as component of Captain America's shield as well as use it in other items such as bullets and knives. They also determined that only nuclear blasts and Vibranium itself is capable of penetrating Vibranium. The organization also developed the satellite Shield 1 to locate Vibranium anywhere on Earth and locate the Chitauri, though the aliens destroyed it.
 In Ultimate Avengers 2: Rise of the Panther, the Chitauri invade Wakanda for their subterranean supply of Vibranium. In this film, the element is portrayed as a substantial power source, as the Chitauri utilize condensed Vibranium cubes to power their spaceships. It is also the principal component of many Wakandan weapons and can be weakened by gamma radiation as well as gamma-powered individuals such as the Hulk.
 Vibranium (also known as Isipho) appears in live-action films set in the Marvel Cinematic Universe. First appearing and named on-screen in Captain America: The First Avenger, Howard Stark states the element is stronger than steel, weighs one third as much, and is completely vibration-absorbent. Having acquired enough to make a shield, Steve Rogers uses it when he becomes Captain America. In The Avengers, Captain America's shield proves strong enough to absorb and repel an attack from Thor's mystical hammer Mjölnir, and in Captain America: The Winter Soldier, it is also shown to be able to cushion falls from great heights. In Avengers: Age of Ultron, Ultron uses vibranium obtained from Ulysses Klaue for multiple purposes, including the creation of the synthezoid Vision. In Captain America: Civil War, Black Panther utilizes a suit composed of a Vibranium weave. In the character's self-titled film, it is revealed that Black Panther's home nation of Wakanda was built atop the crash site of a Vibranium meteor centuries ago, with the metal being used to create and power the nation's advanced technology. The element also affects organic life, as it is used to stabilize Everett Ross' gunshot wound and is what gives the Heart-Shaped Herb its potency. In Avengers: Infinity War, T'Challa gives Bucky Barnes a new prosthetic arm made completely of Vibranium.

Video games
Vibranium appears in Marvel: Ultimate Alliance 2. A nanite-based artificial intelligence known as "the Fold" attempts to harvest Vibranium in Wakanda in order to construct communication towers around the world, spreading its control signal globally. While the heroes manage to thwart the invasion, they are unable to prevent the Fold from constructing enough towers to make it a global threat.

Music
Vibranium is referenced in the 2019 single Take Me Back to London by Ed Sheeran (featuring Stormzy) in verse 3, where Stormzy raps "I drink super-malts and vibranium / I got an RM11 titanium".

It is also referenced in the bridge of the 2020 track Love Is a War by Jeremy Renner, who played Hawkeye in several Marvel Cinematic Universe films. The line is "To hit me harder, I feel nothing / And all my armor is vibranium".

Real-world material

In 2016, Hyperloop Transportation Technologies developed a real-world smart composite material that they named Vibranium. The lightweight carbon fiber material for the Hyperloop pods is reported to provide the passengers double protection against damage to the exterior. The company says that its Vibranium is 8 times lighter than aluminum and 10 times stronger than steel alternatives. The smart material can transmit critical information regarding temperature, stability, integrity and more, wirelessly and virtually instantly.

Journalists have drawn parallels between Wakanda's vibranium reserves and the mining of coltan in the Democratic Republic of Congo. Coltan is an ore containing niobium and tantalum, two rare and valuable metals, and its exploitation is linked with child labour, systematic exploitation of the population by governments or militant groups, exposure to toxic chemicals and other hazards; see coltan mining and ethics. Historian Thomas F. McDow draws a parallel to uranium, found in the  mine Shinkolobwe in Haut-Katanga Province, also in the Democratic Republic of Congo.

Scholarly analysis 
The concept of vibranium as an extremely valuable material, monopolized and mastered by the African civilization of Wakanda, has been subject to scholarly analysis. Several studies have looked at it from the perspective of cultural studies and literary criticism, including tying it to the genre of afrofuturism. Alessio Gerola noted in the context of the 2018 movie Black Panther, that "Fundamental disagreements about vibranium’s existence and use drive the film’s plot, but the mythology and history of vibranium are even more essential to understanding how and why characters like Klaue, Killmonger, T’Challa, and Shuri treat vibranium the way they do", concluding that "Vibranium, from a narrative point of view, simply represents the power of possibilities and the disagreements that arise about the “great responsibilities” that follow from such “great powers.”

It has been also analyzed with regards to its physical properties as a type of supermaterial. In 2017 Mark J. Whiting concluded that vibranium, as described in fiction, is not unrealistic, and resembles "a high-entropy shape-memory alloy composite, reinforced with a ceramic", beyond the ability of our current material science to produce, but not beyond the ability of our current theoretical science to explain. It has been suggested that the popular culture impact of this material can make it useful as a teaching aid when attempting to interest students in material science and related fields.

See also
 Adamantium
 Unobtainium
 Neutronium

References

External links
 World of Black Heroes: Vibranium Biography
 Vibranium at MarvelDatabase.com
 Vibranium MarvelDirectory

Fictional elements introduced in 1966
Fictional metals